The 2021 Cassis Open Provence was a professional tennis tournament played on hard courts. It was the 3rd edition of the tournament which was part of the 2021 ATP Challenger Tour. It took place in Cassis, France between 6 and 12 September 2021.

Singles main-draw entrants

Seeds

 1 Rankings are as of 30 August 2021.

Other entrants
The following players received wildcards into the singles main draw:
  Clément Chidekh
  Arthur Fils
  Luca Van Assche

The following players received entry into the singles main draw as alternates:
  Hugo Grenier
  Tatsuma Ito
  Bernard Tomic
  Yosuke Watanuki

The following players received entry from the qualifying draw:
  Nicolás Jarry
  Hiroki Moriya
  Giovanni Mpetshi Perricard
  Ramkumar Ramanathan

The following players received entry as lucky losers:
  Arthur Cazaux
  Alexis Galarneau
  Laurent Lokoli

Champions

Singles

 Benjamin Bonzi def.  Lucas Pouille 7–6(7–4), 6–4.

Doubles

 Sriram Balaji /  Ramkumar Ramanathan def.  Hans Hach Verdugo /  Miguel Ángel Reyes-Varela 6–4, 3–6, [10–6].

References

2021 ATP Challenger Tour
2021 in French sport
September 2021 sports events in France